Roberto Bentivegna is a British-born Italian screenwriter.

Biography 
Bentivegna was born in London and grew up in Milan. He graduated from Emerson College and received his MFA from Columbia University in 2010.

His screenplay The Eel was named to The Black List in 2012 and is currently under development, starring Sam Rockwell.

In 2022, he was nominated for a BAFTA Award for Outstanding British Film for his work on House of Gucci. He is also adapting Jo Nesbø's novella into an Amazon feature.

In January 2023, it was announced that Bentivegna was going to make his directorial debut with the adaption of the novel The Sound of Things Falling in association with Alibi Media, while also writing the screenplay for it.

References

External links 

 

Living people
Italian screenwriters
British screenwriters
Emerson College alumni
Columbia University School of the Arts alumni
People from London
People from Milan
Year of birth missing (living people)